2,2′-Bipyrimidine is an organic compound with the formula (C4H3N2)2.  It is a derivative of the heterocycle pyrimidine.  It is a white solid.  The compound is used as a bridging ligand in coordination chemistry.

2,2′-Bipyrimidines can be prepared by Ullmann coupling of 2-iodopyrimidines.

References

Chelating agents
Pyrimidines